The economy of French Guiana is tied closely to that of mainland France through subsidies and imports. Besides the French space center at Kourou, fishing and forestry are the most important economic activities in French Guiana. The large reserves of tropical hardwoods, not fully exploited, support an expanding sawmill industry which provides saw logs for export. Cultivation of crops is limited to the coastal area, where the population is largely concentrated; rice and manioc are the major crops. French Guiana is heavily dependent on imports of food and energy. Unemployment is a serious problem, particularly among younger workers.

Budget:
revenues:
$135,5 million
expenditures:
$135,5 million, including capital expenditures of $105 million (1996)

Electricity - production:
465,2 GWh (2003)

Electricity - production by source:
fossil fuel:
100%
hydro:
0%
nuclear:
0%
other:
0% (1998)

Electricity - consumption:
432,6 GWh (2003)

Electricity - exports:
0 kWh (2003)

Electricity - imports:
0 kWh (2003)

A combined power plant with 55 MW solar, 3 MW hydrogen fuel cell, 20MW/38MWh battery and 16 MW hydrogen electrolyser with 88MWh storage began construction in 2021.

Agriculture - products:
rice, manioc (tapioca), sugar, cocoa, vegetables, bananas; cattle, pigs, poultry

Currency:
Euro

Fiscal year:
calendar year

References 

"The economic accounts of Guyana in 2006: first results" (PDF). Retrieved 2008-01-14.

See also 
 Economy of France in: French Guiana, French Polynesia, Guadeloupe, Martinique, Mayotte, New Caledonia, Réunion, Saint Barthélemy, Saint Martin, Saint Pierre and Miquelon, Wallis and Futuna
 Montagne d'Or mine
 Taxation in France
 Economic history of France
 Poverty in France